This is a list of characters in the Garfield comic strip, created by Jim Davis, organized by category and date of first appearance.

Main characters

Garfield 

First Appearance: June 19, 1978

Garfield is Jon's orange cat. Among his personality traits are his laziness, his cynicism and sarcasm, his hatred of Mondays, his tendency to be annoyed by Jon's dog Odie, and his love of lasagna, and his hatred of Nermal. 

In February 2017, a dispute arose on the talk page of the character's Wikipedia page as to the character's gender. Although other characters have persistently referred to Garfield with male pronouns, owing to comments that the character's creator, Jim Davis, made in 2014 to Mental Floss, in which he said, "Garfield is very universal. By virtue of being a cat, really, he's not really male or female or any particular race or nationality, young or old. It gives me a lot more latitude for the humor for the situations. Davis explained that although Garfield is neither male nor female, he does use male pronouns.

Jon Arbuckle 
Jon Arbuckle is Garfield's owner.

First Appearance: June 19, 1978

Lyman 
First Appearance: August 7, 1978

Last Appearance: 

 As a regular: April 24, 1983
 Cameo in the tenth anniversary strip: June 19, 1988

In The Garfield Show episode "Long Lost Lyman" (season 3), effort is made to explain what became of the character in-continuity. Lyman is said to have left Odie with Jon, before moving away to work as a wildlife photographer in a distant jungle. When Jon learns that Lyman disappeared while searching for a mythical Bigfoot-like creature, Jon, Garfield, and Odie travel to the jungle to find him. The "Long Lost Lyman" version of Lyman has round eyes resembling Jon's, rather than the dot-eyes of his traditional comics design, and is voiced by Frank Ferrante.

Odie 
Odie is a dog that resides with Jon and Garfield.

First Appearance: August 8, 1978

Pooky 
First Appearance: October 23, 1978'Pooky is Garfield's toy bear that was found in a drawer by Garfield. Garfield often carries Pooky around and makes him interact with Jon.

 Dr. Liz Wilson 
First Appearance: June 26, 1979

On Garfield and Friends, Liz was voiced by Julie Payne, occasionally appearing in the first two seasons and once in the fourth season. In the live-action/animated movies, she is played by Jennifer Love Hewitt. Her first, albeit brief, television appearance was on the second TV special, Garfield on the Town.

In The Garfield Show, she is once again voiced by Julie Payne.

 Nermal 
First Appearance: September 3, 1979

Nermal is a small grey male tabby cat with thick eyelashes. Despite being an adult cat, he is smaller than most and prefers to call himself "the world's cutest kitten". Nermal was first introduced as Jon's parents' kitten.

In Garfield and Friends, he is played by Desirée Goyette. In Garfield: The Movie, Nermal is portrayed as a Siamese cat in the neighborhood, and is voiced by David Eigenberg. Nermal is voiced by Jason Marsden in The Garfield Show, as well as in the films Garfield Gets Real, Garfield's Fun Fest, and Garfield's Pet Force.

 Arlene 
First Appearance: December 17, 1980

Arlene is a pink cat with thick eyelashes, large lips, and a gap between her two front teeth. She is a love interest for Garfield and is often made fun of by him for her tooth gap.

In the Garfield film, she appears as a (purple shade) Russian Blue cat, voiced by Debra Messing.

 Squeak 
First Appearance: October 30, 1984

On Garfield and Friends, the character was named Floyd and voiced by Gregg Berger, who also reprises the role in The Garfield Show. Arbuckle Family 

 Mom 
First Appearance: February 13, 1980

 Dad 
First Appearance: February 13, 1980

In The Garfield Show, he is voiced by Frank Welker.

 Aunt Gussie 
First Appearance: August 14, 1981

 Grandma 
First Appearance: January 25, 1982

Jon's grandmother appears in Garfield's Thanksgiving and A Garfield Christmas Special, in which she is voiced by Pat Carroll.

 Doc Boy 
First Appearance: May 17, 1983

In A Garfield Christmas Special, he was voiced by David Lander.

Doc Boy also appears in six episodes of The Garfield Show, with Lander reprising his role.

Garfield's family
 Garfield's mother 
Garfield's mother first appeared in the animated specials Garfield on the Town and Garfield: His 9 Lives. She has since made several cameos in the comic strip, including a December 1984 story that is a loose adaptation of Garfield on the Town. She also appeared once on Garfield and Friends, in an episode called "The Garfield Rap." Sandi Huge provided her voice in the specials. 

 Garfield's grandfather 
First Appearance: November 10, 1980

Garfield's grandpa first appeared in the strip on November 10, 1980.

In Garfield on the Town, a different-looking, rougher maternal grandfather is seen living with Garfield's mother. Whether the comic strip's version is Garfield's paternal grandfather has not been explicitly clarified.

 Minor recurring characters 
 Herman Post 
First Appearance: July 19, 1978

Jon Arbuckle's mailman was a character on the first four seasons of Garfield and Friends. In "The Mail Animal", he is fired because his boss, the postmaster, perceives him as being weak-willed. However, Garfield treats the postmaster even worse, resulting in the postmaster begging Post to return to work.

In The Garfield Show episode "Mailman Blues", he goes on vacation to Hawaii. Before Post goes on vacation, he warns his replacement, Stu, about Garfield, describing him as a "monster". While Herman Post is on his vacation, Garfield torments Stu. However, Stu quits, and Herman returns early only after receiving a raise. He reveals that this has happened every year for 13 years.

In Garfield and Friends, the mailman was voiced by Gregg Berger.

 Irma 
First Appearance: June 9, 1979

 Binky the Clown 
First Appearance: September 17, 1986

A television personality noted for his extremely loud and piercing greetings, most notably "HEEEEEEEY, KIDS!" He appears to be a parody of Bozo the Clown, and in the cartoons shares an exaggerated raspy voice with the Bob Bell portrayal of Bozo. He is often compared to Krusty the Clown from The Simpsons, who is also portrayed with an exaggeratedly raspy voice, based on Bell's.

The character first appeared in the animated TV special Garfield's Halloween Adventure.

He was first mentioned in the comic strip on March 13, 1985. Other clowns are seen prior to this mention, but appear to be different characters. Binky was first seen in the comics on September 15, 1986, then appeared in person on September 17, 1986.

The Big Vicious Dog
First Appearance: September 12, 1995

 Hubert and Reba 
Hubert and Reba are an elderly couple who live near Jon. Hubert is often portrayed as an older man, while Reba is often either unseen or tending to household chores. The couple made an appearance in Here Comes Garfield''. In the animated cartoon, Hubert is portrayed as hostile towards Garfield and Odie, after Garfield tore up their yard and knocked flowers and dirt on Hubert's head. He calls the animal shelter personnel to remove them. In the strips, Hubert is less hostile towards Garfield.

References

 
Lists of comic strip characters
Lists of characters in American television animation